The Cookie Lady may refer to:

 The Cookie Lady (short story), a short story by Philip K. Dick
 June Curry, resident of Afton, Virginia, known for providing refreshments and shelter to long-distance bicyclists